The HP 7470 was a small low-cost desktop pen plotter introduced by Hewlett Packard's San Diego division in 1982. It was the first small-format plot that moved the paper, rather than the pens.
It used a revolutionary "grit wheel" design which moved the paper held in place by a wheel with embedded grit and a pinch roller.

The HP 7470 had two pens, one on either side and plotted on ANSI A (8.5 x 11 inch) or A4-sized paper. It was much less expensive than the previous flatbed design. It was very heavy but had 4 pens. The HP 7475 used a rotating carousel with six pens. That plotter was used in greeting card kiosks. This design was also scaled up for very large pen plotters. These were driven by  the HP-GL plotter language which used ASCII commands such as PA 300, 4500;PD;. The plotter had three electrical interfaces: HP-IB, RS-232, and HP-IL for HP handheld calculators. 

Pen plotters became obsolete with the adoption of ink-jet printers, and processors fast enough to rasterize complex images. Houston Instrument and other manufacturers would follow with similar plotters.

References

External links 

 HP 7470A Operators manual
 HP article on the engineering of the 7470A

Pen plotters
7470